The seventh and final season of Melrose Place, an American television series, premiered on Fox on July 27, 1998. The series finale aired on May 24, 1999, after 35 episodes. 

The season was co-produced by Heather Locklear and Antoinette Stella, coordinating procure Robert Del Valle, supervising producer Peter Dunne, and executive producers Aaron Spelling, E. Duke Vincent, Carol Mendelsohn and Charles Pratt, Jr.

The season was released on DVD as two-volume box sets under the title of Melrose Place – The Seventh and Final Season: Volumes One and Two on July 31, 2012, by Paramount Home Video.

Storylines

When Amanda marries evil businessman Rory Blake (Anthony Tyler Quinn), Kyle ruins the ceremony after discovering that the woman he saw killed by a train was actually a swindler. Taylor and Nick had manipulated the fake Christine into working for them; the real Christine had been killed by a bomb in Iraq. After Rory tries to kill Amanda for her money, Kyle kills him in self-defense and they remarry.

Cooper forces Lexi to remarry him, ostensibly to protect her from prosecution for her late father's business deals but also to kill her and get her father's money.

Michael attends his high-school reunion and reunites with Jane, his first wife, who follows him to Melrose Place. Samantha and Jeff try to break up Billy and Jennifer by sending a fake fax from Alison in Atlanta, which breaks Jennifer's heart because she thinks he still cares about her.

Samantha, Jennifer, Billy, Taylor and Coop leave in the season's seventh episode, which was produced as the finale for season six and held over by the network. Taylor gives birth to Michael's son (Michael Junior McBride) and agrees to share motherhood with the returning Jane. She then reconsiders, returning to Boston to raise the baby alone. After Coop's attempt on Lexi's life on a fishing boat, he leaves town to take a job with a man who had tried to con Megan into sex.

New characters were added beginning in the eighth episode, which was the first episode produced as part of season seven, including Kyle's younger brother Ryan McBride (John Haymes Newton) (whose daughter lived in a New York convent after her mother's death) and Eve Cleary (Rena Sofer), Amanda's friend from school. Matt, who had moved away a year earlier, is revealed to have died in a car crash on his way to a reunion dinner at Kyle's restaurant. He kept a coveted journal of all the secrets the residents shared with him.

After her sham remarriage to Cooper, Lexi apologizes to Peter for blaming him for her father's death and they reconcile. However, Peter realizes that he still cares for Amanda and Lexi dumps him again, and this time for good. Lexi then launches a campaign against Amanda, buying the Melrose Place building from her and opening a new advertising agency, Sterling-Conway Advertising, which drives her out of business.

Amanda and Eve Cleary were high-school cheerleaders in Dallas, Texas. An ugly encounter ended in the death of Eve's boyfriend and her 15-year imprisonment. Kyle learns about their past, agreeing to keep it from Peter (Eve's new husband).

When Kyle and Amanda try to conceive Peter accidentally gives him the wrong test results, indicating that he is sterile. Kyle descends into alcoholism; Amanda is depressed by his behavior, until they reconcile after Kyle finishes rehab. Although Amanda agrees to sell the building to buy their dream home, their marriage ends.

Josie Bissett returned to the series as Jane in 1998, and plotlines centered on her rekindling relationship with Michael. She slept with a client of Amanda's the day before her wedding to Michael, leading to his distrust of her as they decide to marry again. After exchanging vows again, they are estranged and on the road to divorce within hours. They have a brief reunion at Christmas.

Megan and Ryan begin a relationship, marrying in the series finale. Jane joins Kyle (the actors were married in real life) and Amanda joins Peter (despite his marriage to Eve). Lexi becomes sexually involved with Michael, but they break up after she rejects his proposal (realizing that they cannot be faithful to each other).

By early 1999, Fox decided to cancel the show due to falling ratings and high production costs. In the final episode, Amanda and Peter face mounting scrutiny; he is investigated for embezzling from the hospital, and she learns that Amanda (not Eve) killed her boyfriend 15 years ago. When they flee the country their hideout explodes, apparently killing them both. Eve cracks at their memorial service, throws Peter's ashes on Lexi and is jailed. Michael becomes Wilshire Hospital's chief-of-staff. Kyle and Jane discover that she is having Michael's baby, and an anonymous envelope appears containing Amanda's locket. At the end of the series finale Amanda and Peter marry on a tropical beach, rejoicing at their success in faking their deaths and paying Michael a million dollars in hush money. In the final scene, they walk along the beach to "Closing Time."

Cast

Main cast members
In alphabetical order
 Linden Ashby as Dr. Brett Cooper (episodes 1–7)
 Josie Bissett as Jane Mancini (episodes 8–35; recurring episodes 4–7)
 Thomas Calabro as Michael Mancini 
 Rob Estes as Kyle McBride
 Brooke Langton as Samantha Reilly (episodes 1–7)
 Jamie Luner as Lexi Sterling 
 Alyssa Milano as Jennifer Mancini (episodes 1–7)
 John Haymes Newton as Ryan McBride (episodes 8+)
 Lisa Rinna as Taylor McBride (episodes 1–7)
 Kelly Rutherford as Megan Lewis 
 Andrew Shue as Billy Campbell (episodes 1–7)
 Jack Wagner as Peter Burns

Special guest star
 Heather Locklear as Amanda Woodward

Recurring guest stars
Dan Gauthier as Jeff Baylor
Rena Sofer as Eve Cleary
Chea Courtney as Sarah McBride
Alexandra Paul as Terry O'Brien
Mark L. Taylor as Dr. Louis Visconti

Episodes

References

1998 American television seasons
1999 American television seasons